Jin Prefecture, also known by its Chinese name Jinzhou, was a prefecture of imperial China. Its seat—also known as Jinzhou—was at Luyang (near modern Mayang, Hunan).

History
Jin was created from Chen Prefecture (Chénzhōu) in AD 686 under the Tang Dynasty. It was later renamed Luyang Commandery (Lúyángjùn).

See also
 Other Jin Prefectures/Jinzhous

References

Citations

Bibliography
 .

Prefectures of the Tang dynasty
Former prefectures in Hunan